Umm Isḥāq bint Ṭalḥa ibn ʿUbayd Allāh (Arabic: أم إسحاق بنت طَلحَة بن عُبَيد الله) was one of the wives of Hasan ibn Ali. After his death, she married Hasan's brother, Husayn ibn Ali.

Biography 

Umm Ishaq was the daughter of Talha ibn Ubayd Allah. She was reported to be among the most beautiful women of Quraysh.

Umm Ishaq was one of the wives of Hasan ibn Ali. After Hasan was killed, she married Husayn ibn Ali. After Husayn was killed, she married Abd Allah ibn Muhammad ibn Abd al-Rahman ibn Abi Bakr. It is said that before this marriage to Abd Allah, she had married Tammam ibn al-Abbas ibn Abd al-Muttalib.

Children 
Umm Ishaq had three children from Hasan ibn Ali: Husayn (who was known as al-Athram), Talha ibn Hasan, and Fatima bint Hasan.

She also had one daughter from Husayn: Fatima al-Kubra. She also bore a daughter, Amina to Abd Allah ibn Muhammad ibn Abd al-Rahman ibn Abi Bakr.

References 

7th-century births
7th-century women
7th-century Arabs
7th-century people from the Umayyad Caliphate
Women from the Umayyad Caliphate
Wives of Husayn ibn Ali
Tabi‘un
Wives of Shiite Imams